Terrapin Mountain is located on the border of Alberta and British Columbia on the Continental Divide. It was named in 1918. A ridge extending north from the mountain terminates at Naiset Point.

Climate

Based on the Köppen climate classification, Terrapin Mountain is located in a subarctic climate with cold, snowy winters, and mild summers.

See also
 List of peaks on the Alberta–British Columbia border
 Mountains of Alberta
 Mountains of British Columbia

References

Terrapin Mountain
Terrapin Mountain
Canadian Rockies